The 2015 WNBA season was a season for the Connecticut Sun of the Women's National Basketball Association.

WNBA Draft

Trades

Roster

Schedule
Connecticut Sun 2015 Schedule - Sun Home and Away - ESPN

Playoffs

Statistics

Regular season

Awards and honors

References

External links
THE OFFICIAL SITE OF THE CONNECTICUT SUN

Connecticut Sun seasons
Connecticut Sun
Connecticut Sun